Macarostola ceryx is a moth of the family Gracillariidae. It is known from Papua New Guinea.

References

External links
Images of this species at: www.papua-insects.nl

Macarostola
Moths described in 1955